Brent Allen Hughes (born April 5, 1966) is a Canadian ice hockey coach and retired left winger. He played in the National Hockey League for the Winnipeg Jets, Boston Bruins, Buffalo Sabres, and New York Islanders.

Career 
In his NHL career, Hughes played in 357 games, scoring 41 goals and 39 assists. He later worked as the head coach of the Austin Ice Bats of the Central Hockey League until that team ended its operations in 2008. On February 19, 2009, he was hired by the Corpus Christi IceRays as their new head coach.

Career statistics

Regular season and playoffs

Awards
 WHL West First All-Star Team – 1987

References

External links

1966 births
Living people
Baltimore Skipjacks players
Boston Bruins players
Buffalo Sabres players
Canadian ice hockey coaches
Canadian ice hockey left wingers
Houston Aeros (1994–2013) players
Ice hockey people from British Columbia
Maine Mariners players
Moncton Hawks players
New Westminster Bruins players
New York Islanders players
Providence Bruins players
Sportspeople from New Westminster
Undrafted National Hockey League players
Utah Grizzlies (IHL) players
Victoria Cougars (WHL) players
Winnipeg Jets (1979–1996) players
Canadian expatriate ice hockey players in the United States